A lavender marriage is a male–female mixed-orientation marriage, undertaken as a marriage of convenience to conceal the socially stigmatised sexual orientation of one or both partners. The term dates from the early 20th century and is used almost exclusively to characterize certain marriages of public celebrities in the first half of the 20th century, primarily before World War II, when public attitudes made it impossible for a person acknowledging homosexuality to pursue a public career, notably in the Hollywood film industry. One of the earliest uses of the phrase appeared in the British press in 1895, at a time when the colour of lavender was associated with homosexuality.

In Anglosphere
With the inclusion of morality clauses in the contracts of Hollywood actors in the 1920s, some closeted stars contracted marriages of convenience to protect their public reputations and preserve their careers. A noteworthy exception that demonstrated the precarious position of the public homosexual was that of William Haines, who brought his career to a sudden end at the age of 35. He refused to end his relationship with his male partner, Jimmy Shields, and enter into a marriage at the direction of his studio employer, Metro-Goldwyn-Mayer. Some companies punished actors for defying these clauses by not paying them. Universal Film Company justified their actions by labeling the actor's behavior as unacceptable; this included having attractions that were not heterosexual. These clauses placed actors in a difficult situation as they put their livelihoods on the line and essentially pressured them into lavender marriages. Lavender marriages were also a way to preserve the public's image of a celebrity, especially if these celebrities were famous for their looks or sex appeal. The end of the 20th century brought about a change for the LGBTQ+ community, particularly after the 1969 Stonewall riots. Because of this, lavender marriages between celebrities became less common.

The term lavender marriage has been used to characterize the following couples/individuals:

 The English broadcaster and journalist Nancy Spain considered entering a lavender marriage to disguise her relationship with Joan Werner Laurie, a magazine and book editor.
 The marriage of Robert Taylor and Barbara Stanwyck supposedly disguised the purported bisexuality of both and has been characterized as lavender for that reason, but it was prompted by the need to protect both their reputations after a Photoplay magazine article reported they had been living together for years while unmarried.
 Actor Rock Hudson, troubled by rumors that Confidential magazine was planning to expose his homosexuality, married Phyllis Gates, a young woman employed by his agent, in 1955. Gates insisted until the time of her own death that she had had no idea the marriage was anything other than legitimate.
 The term has been applied to the marriage of Tyrone Power and French actress Annabella in 1939.
 American theater actress and producer Katharine Cornell married stage director Guthrie McClintic in 1921. She appeared only in productions he directed, and they lived together in their Manhattan townhouse until his death in 1961.
 Swedish Hollywood actor Nils Asther and vaudeville entertainer Vivian Duncan had a brief marriage of convenience that resulted in one child; Asther was a well known homosexual who had a relationship with actor/stuntman Kenneth DuMain.
 Hollywood film actress Janet Gaynor and costume designer Adrian were married from 1939 until his death in 1959, and had a son together. Gaynor was rumored to be bisexual and Adrian was openly gay within the Hollywood community, and it is assumed their relationship was a lavender marriage mandated by the studio system. Gaynor later re-married, to producer Paul Gregory and she and Gregory were close friends with Broadway actress Mary Martin, who was rumored to be bisexual, and Mary Martin's husband Richard Halliday, a drama critic who was a closeted gay man. The foursome lived together on Martin's ranch in the state of Goiás, Brazil, for several years.

Although lavender marriages are typically associated with LGBTQ+ celebrities, people of all backgrounds have used them for protection and convenience. These individuals have found solace on websites where they can express their distress about their marriages of convenience, but not many have talked about their experience outside of the Internet, apart from an article in The Guardian in November 2019, asking individuals to share their reasons for marrying for convenience. In November 2017, an article was published by the BBC about marriages of convenience in Asian LGBTQ+ communities in the UK.

The BBC article and its participants refer to a "marriage of convenience" rather than a lavender marriage, but they are still referring to a marriage that hides one or both partner's sexuality. Individuals reported that family expectations and keeping up an image were several reasons why they had a marriage of convenience. Awemir Iqbal, a gay man originally from Pakistan and residing in West Yorkshire, stated that he understood why people had a marriage of convenience to satisfy their family's wishes. A fear of tarnishing the family name, or being disowned if they were to express their sexuality by pursuing same-sex relationships, leads some to enter into a marriage of convenience. Support for LGBTQ+ individuals comes from "Karma Nirvana", a group to help individuals escaping forced marriages. Karma Nirvana's founder, Jasvinder Sanghera, says there are probably more marriages of convenience than are reported. Websites such as Mocmatch, Saathinight, Al-Jannah are places where individuals can find partners to partake in a marriage of convenience.

In Sinosphere 

Lavender marriages are known as Tongqi or Tongfu in China, where same-sex marriages or the LGBTQ+ community are not usually accepted. During the Chinese New Year, people travel home to celebrate with their families, but young people also have to worry about pressures surrounding marriage and having children. For gay Chinese men and lesbian Chinese women, societal pressure to have a heterosexual relationship can be so profound that they often turn to lavender marriages or "cooperative [marriages]". Some individuals, like Tiger Zhao, marry lesbian women to undertake societal and parental expectations and ease some pressure. Many couples report that the lavender marriages do more harm than good if individuals deny themselves the expression of their sexuality outside of the marriage.

However, smaller LGBTQ+ communities have gained enough momentum for an app to have been developed specifically focused on providing lavender marriages for LGBTQ+ individuals. The app, called "Queers", has been discontinued, but it made such an impact in the LGBTQ+ community that former members have asked Queers founder, Liao Zhuoying, for a partner of the opposite sex they can take home to prevent nagging from family members.

See also

 Beard (companion)
 Boston marriage
 He never married
 Hollywood marriage
 Mariage blanc
 Sham marriage

References

1890s neologisms
LGBT and society
LGBT terminology
Sham marriage
LGBT marriage